Awantikapuri is a place in Azamgarh district which is now known as Avak, situated just 20 kilometres from the Azamgarh railway Station. It is known for its historical importance. It is situated in the Mohammadpur development block. Tradition says that Raja Janmejai (son of Raja Parikshit)  organized a yagya there just to kill all the snakes of the planet. The ponds and temples of this place are very famous. This place has a somewhat religious importance for Hindus.

Villages in Azamgarh district